The Museum of Applied Arts is a museum in Budapest, Hungary. It is the third-oldest applied arts museum in the world.

Architecture
The museum was built between 1893 and 1896 and was designed by Ödön Lechner in the Hungarian Secession style. It has a green roof and the interior is designed using Hindu, Mogul, and Islamic designs. The building is in need of renovation, for which plans have been developed. It’s under renovation now.

Collection
The museum houses a collection of metalwork, furniture, textiles, and glass. It also has a library. There are two other locations: the Hopp Ferenc Museum of Eastern Asiatic Arts and Nagytétény Palace.

The museum is located near the southern end of the Grand Boulevard in the neighborhood Ferencváros and it can be accessed by metro line 3.

Gallery

References

External links
  The museum's web page
  Permanent furniture exhibition at the Nagytétény Castle Museum
Virtual tour of the Museum of Applied Arts provided by Google Arts & Culture

Museums in Budapest
Landmarks in Hungary
Art museums and galleries in Hungary
Decorative arts museums
Art Nouveau architecture in Budapest
Applied Arts
Buildings and structures completed in 1896
Visionary environments